Reddipalayam is a village in the Ariyalur taluk of Ariyalur district, Tamil Nadu, India.

Demographics 

 census, Reddipalayam had a total population of 3571 with 1832 males and 1739 females.

This place is famous for its rich limestone deposits and therefore India's one of the largest cement producer, UltraTech Cement Ltd, (Aditya Birla Group) has a plant (RdCW) here with production capacity of about 4000 tonnes of cement per day. Most people of this village depend solely on the company for their livelihood either by working in the factory or by running petty businesses like tea shop, hotel etc. A large number of trucks are seen here and as a result, there are automobile garages also.

It is 12 km away from its district headquarters, Ariyalur. 70 km away from Trichy and 47 km away from Tanjore.

Places nearby: Jayankondam - 25  Km,Gangaikonda Cholapuram - 36 km,  
Chidambaram - 75 km

It is a part of the latest formed district in the state. Moderate climate. Easily accessible by road and rail. State run buses are available round the clock. The bus stop near is V.Kaikaati (vilaangudi kaikaati) were one can get buses 24 hours towards Chennai, Trichy and Tanjavore. V.kaikaati is a place of intersection of state's busiest roads Trichy- Chidambaram and Ariyalur- Muttuvaancherry (SH139) roads. V.Kaikatti is a largest Revenue place in Reddipalayam.

References 

Villages in Ariyalur district